Galata is a 2014 Indian Telugu romantic comedy film written and directed by Krishna, making his debut. The film is produced by D.Rajendera Prasad Varma under the banner Creative Pixels.It features Srinivas and Hariprriya in the lead roles, with Nagendra Babu and P. Saikumar in supporting roles. The score and soundtrack for the film is by Sunil Kashyap.

Cast 
 Srinivas as Chitti
 Hariprriya as Andaal 
 Nagendra Babu
 P. Sai Kumar
 Ali

Soundtrack 

The film's background score and the soundtracks are composed by Sunil Kashyap. The music rights were acquired by Aditya Music.

References 

2010s Telugu-language films